Jutta Brunnée is a scholar of international and environmental law who is a university professor and the Metcalf Chair in Environmental Law at the University of Toronto Faculty of Law. In December 2020, she was named the dean of the Faculty of Law, with a term to commence January 1, 2021.

Brunnée received a doctorate in law at Johannes-Gutenberg Universität and an LLM from Dalhousie University's faculty of law, the latter in 1987. She taught at McGill University Faculty of Law from 1990 to 1995, and at Peter A. Allard School of Law from 1995 to 2000. She began teaching at the University of Toronto in 2000, and has remained there since.

Ingrid Wuerth describes Brunnée's view in international law theory as constructivist.

Publications

References

External links 
 Profile at University of Toronto Faculty of Law
 
 

Johannes Gutenberg University Mainz alumni
International law scholars
Living people
Schulich School of Law alumni
Academic staff of the University of Toronto Faculty of Law
Women legal scholars
Year of birth missing (living people)
Members of the Institut de Droit International